Elsa Wiezell (November 19, 1926 – August 23, 2014) was a Paraguayan poet and teacher. Her work also includes paintings that reside in art galleries and cultural centers of Asunción. She was born in Asunción, Paraguay, daughter of Julia Apezteguía and Rubén Wiezell, of Swedish descent.

Childhood and youth 
She spent her childhood surrounded by her family, playing games and pranks with her siblings Genoveva and Nills in the once quiet streets of Zeballos Cué. They moved later and definitively to Asunción. She completed her primary studies in Asuncion at the International School.

In her youth, her inclination towards poetry was evident, and she began her first literary works at that time. Entranced in her thoughts, she always searched for places of self-discovery. This took her to the college studies at the National University of Asuncion, where she finished her studies with a bachelor's degree in philosophy and literature in 1950.

Career 
After graduating, she taught Secondary Level psychology courses at the Benjamin Aceval School in Asunción. She was also in charge of the psychology class at the University of Columbia.

Committed to the diffusion of arts and culture within Paraguay, she founded such institutions as the Modern Art Museum, the journal The Feminist (for which she was chief editor), and the Belle Arts School, serving as director from 1965 to 1977.

Awards 
Throughout her career, Elsa Wiezell has been internationally acclaimed and rewarded (even more than in her own native Paraguay) and is considered by many critics and academic scholars to be amongst the most important and influential Spanish-language poets of her time. Many scholars study her work, including Charles Richard Carlisle (Professor of Spanish Literature at Southwest Texas University in Texas, United States), Carlos Sabat Ercasty Carlos Sabat Ercasty and Norma Suiffet (Professor of Literature at Institute of Superior Studies in Uruguay and Specialist in Spanish Philosophy at the University of Salamanca, Spain).

Style 
In her work can be perceived a placid poetic style. Her loose verses give the sensation of peaceful freedom and smooth movement. Her style is rich in literary language.

The inspiration and subjects of her works are almost tangible. Water is a recurrent subject, and she also refers to loneliness and to the dreams that usually clash with a reality manifested, for example, as "painful destiny of the body at the earth...". Carlos Sabat Ercasty has written, "The work of Elsa Wiezell is beautiful and dignified, predetermined by a noble double heroism, marching high and sustaining flight..."

Family 

She was married to Vicente Ferrer Espínola, and had three children: Lourdes, Armando and Patricia.

References 

 Wiezell, Elsa "Tren del agua" ("Train of the Water"). Imprenta Salesiana. 1996. Asuncion.

External links 
 Los Poetas
 El Poder De La Palabra

1926 births
2014 deaths
Paraguayan feminists
Paraguayan people of Basque descent
Paraguayan people of Swedish descent
Paraguayan women painters
Paraguayan women poets
People from Asunción
Universidad Nacional de Asunción alumni
20th-century Paraguayan painters
20th-century Paraguayan poets
21st-century Paraguayan poets
20th-century Paraguayan women writers
21st-century Paraguayan women writers
20th-century women artists
21st-century women artists